Pleurtuit is a commune in the Ille-et-Vilaine department of Brittany in northwestern France.

Population
Inhabitants of Pleurtuit are called in French pleurtuisiens.

See also
 Dinard - Pleurtuit - Saint-Malo Airport
Communes of the Ille-et-Vilaine department

References

External links

Official website of Pleurtuit 

Mayors of Ille-et-Vilaine Association 

Communes of Ille-et-Vilaine